Meera Nandan is an Indian actress who appears mainly in Malayalam films. She also appeared in a few Tamil and Telugu films.

Early life 
Meera Nandan was born as Meera Nandakumar on 26 November 1990 as the daughter of Nandakumar and Maya at Perandoor, Elamakkara, Kochi. She has a younger brother Arjun Nandakumar, who is also an actor. She did her schooling in Bhavans Vidya Mandir, Elamakkara. After completing her degree in English literature from St. Teresa's College, Ernakulam, she pursued her master's degree in Mass Communication with Journalism through distant education from Manipal University. She is distantly related to actress Divya Unni.

Career 
Meera first appearance before the camera was in an advertisement for Mohanlal's Taste Buds. In 2007, she auditioned as a competitor in Idea Star Singer aired on Asianet Television but was selected as an anchor for the programme. She anchored television programmes on Amrita TV and Jeevan TV as well.

She made her acting debut in Malayalam cinema the following year, playing the female lead in Lal Jose's Mulla. Lal Jose was looking for "a new face with a girl next door look" and Poornima, wife of actor Indrajith Sukumaran, thought that Meera suited the role and approached her. After discussing with her parents, she accepted the role of Lachi, a "bold, smart and outgoing girl", which won her accolades. The next year she made her Tamil cinema debut with Vaalmiki and quickly signed a few more Tamil films: K. T. Kunjumon's Kadhalukku Maranamillai, Ayyanar and Suriya Nagaram.

She debuted in Telugu cinema in 2011 with Jai Bolo Telangana. The Malayalam film, Seniors saw her playing the role of a villain, with Meera stating that the film was "a revelation even to me". Including Seniors she had four Malayalam releases in 2011, but she felt that it was not a good year for her as none of them helped her career. In 2013, she was first seen as a journalist in Lokpal. That year she also turned playback singer. She sang the romantic number "Mazhayude Ormakal" composed by Ratheesh Vegha for V. K. Prakash's Silence. Her debut Kannada film Karodpathi, for which she had begun shooting in 2012, then titled as Kotyadhipathi, released after a long delay in 2014. She played the role of a tribal girl in Black Forest, which won the National Film Award for Best Film on Environment Conservation/Preservation.

She was next seen playing a prominent role in Madhav Ramadasan's Apothecary. Her final release Mylanchi Monchulla Veedu in which she played a Muslim girl. 2015 she had next first release in three years, Sandamarutham. In Telugu, she has completed filming for Hitudu (earlier titled Gunde Ninda Gudigantalu), in which she will be seen as a tribal woman in three different stages, as a 14-year-old, as a 23-year-old and as a 35-year-old. She lent her voice for Taapsee's character in the film Doubles.

Other work
In 2014, she moved to Dubai to work as a Radio Jockey in Radio Red 94.7 FM. She, however, informed in social media that she will continue to work in films along with her job as RJ.

She has now joined Gold 101.3 FM in Ajman as RJ.

Filmography

Films 

Music albums

 As singer
Silence (2013)

As dubbing artiste
Doubles for Taapsee Pannu

Television

Awards and nominations

References

External links 

 

Indian film actresses
Actresses from Kochi
Actresses in Tamil cinema
Actresses in Telugu cinema
Living people
1990 births
Actresses in Malayalam cinema
21st-century Indian actresses
Indian women television presenters
Indian television presenters
Actresses in Malayalam television
Indian television actresses
Actresses in Kannada cinema
St. Teresa's College alumni